Twin Peaks are two prominent peaks along the foothills east of the Santa Cruz Mountains in Santa Clara County, California.  The peaks are nestled between Uvas Reservoir to the west, and Paradise Valley in Morgan Hill to the east.  The headwaters for Sycamore Creek rise from the eastern hillsides near these peaks.

Although part of the Uvas Reservoir County Park, no trails currently lead to the peaks from the park side.

See also 
 List of summits of the San Francisco Bay Area

References

External links
 

Mountains of Santa Clara County, California
Morgan Hill, California
Mountains of the San Francisco Bay Area
Mountains of Northern California